A Pythagorean prime is a prime number of the  Pythagorean primes are exactly the odd prime numbers that are the sum of two squares; this characterization is Fermat's theorem on sums of two squares.

For instance, the number 5 is a Pythagorean prime;   is the hypotenuse of a right triangle with legs 1 and 2, and 5 itself is the hypotenuse of a right triangle with legs 3 and 4.

Values and density
The first few Pythagorean primes are

By Dirichlet's theorem on arithmetic progressions, this sequence is infinite.

Representation as a sum of two squares
Fermat's theorem on sums of two squares states that the prime numbers that can be represented as sums of two squares are exactly 2 and the odd primes congruent to  The representation of each such number is unique, up to the ordering of the two squares.

By using the Pythagorean theorem, this representation can be interpreted geometrically: the Pythagorean primes are exactly the odd prime numbers  such that there exists a right triangle, with integer legs, whose hypotenuse has  They are also exactly the prime numbers  such that there exists a right triangle with integer sides whose hypotenuse has  For, if the triangle with legs  and  has hypotenuse length  (with ), then the triangle with legs  and  has hypotenuse 

Another way to understand this representation as a sum of two squares involves Gaussian integers, the complex numbers whose real part and imaginary part are both  The norm of a Gaussian integer  is the  Thus, the Pythagorean primes (and 2) occur as norms of Gaussian integers, while other primes do not. Within the Gaussian integers, the Pythagorean primes are not considered to be prime numbers, because they can be factored as

Similarly, their squares can be factored in a different way than their integer factorization, as

The real and imaginary parts of the factors in these factorizations are the leg lengths of the right triangles having the given hypotenuses.

Quadratic residues

In the finite field  with  a Pythagorean prime, the polynomial equation  has two solutions. This may be expressed by saying that  is a quadratic residue  In contrast, this equation has no solution in the finite fields  where  is an odd prime but is not 

For every Pythagorean prime , there exists a Paley graph with  vertices, representing the numbers  with two numbers adjacent in the graph if and only if their difference is a quadratic residue. This definition produces the same adjacency relation regardless of the order in which the two numbers are subtracted to compute their difference, because of the property of Pythagorean primes that  is a quadratic

References

External links
 
 

Classes of prime numbers
Squares in number theory